We Iraqis (2004) is a documentary film written and directed by the Iraqi-French film director Abbas Fahdel.

The film shows daily life in Baghdad, just before and after the 2003 invasion of Iraq. The fears and hopes of a people that is emerging from the nightmare of a dictatorship only to fall into chaos.

 French title: Nous les Irakiens
 Arabic title: نحن العراقيون

Synopsis
Daily life in Baghdad, in a home like many others, that of the director's brother. The preparations waiting for the outbreak of war, the comments in front of the images on TV, stocking up on food, the difficulty of the children to go to school ... After the fall of Saddam Hussein's regime, the director returned to Baghdad and meets the people. "I came to film death, but life got the upper hand".

Awards
 Mention of the Jury, 15th African, Asian and Latin American Film Festival, Milan, Italy, 2005

See also

Cinema of Iraq
Iraqi culture

References

External links
 
 Official website  
 We Iraqis at the International Festival of Audiovisual Programs 
 We Iraqis, at Doc & Film International 
 Photo gallery 

2004 films
French documentary films
Iraqi documentary films
Documentary films about the Iraq War
Films directed by Abbas Fahdel
2004 documentary films
2000s French films